Luarca Club de Fútbol is a Spanish football team based in Luarca, in the autonomous community of Asturias. Founded in 1912, it plays in Tercera División RFEF – Group 2, holding home games at Estadio La Veigona, which has a capacity of 1,500 spectators.

Season to season

17 seasons in Tercera División
1 season in Tercera División RFEF

External links
Futbolme team profile 
Futbolenasturias team profile 

Football clubs in Asturias
Association football clubs established in 1912
1912 establishments in Spain
Divisiones Regionales de Fútbol clubs